MOPSO is a zwitterionic organic chemical buffering agent; one of Good's buffers. MOPSO and MOPS (3-morpholinopropanesulfonic acid) are chemically similar, differing only in the presence of a hydroxyl group on the C-2 of the propane moiety. It has a useful pH range of 6.5-7.9 in the physiological range, making it useful for cell culture work. It has a pKa of 6.9 with ΔpKa/°C of -0.015 and a solubility in water at 0°C of 0.75 M.

MOPSO has been used as a buffer component for:
 Copper analysis via:
 Flow injection micellar technique of the catalytic reaction of 3-methyl-2-benzothiazolinone hydrazone and N-ethyl-N-(2-hydroxy-3-sulfopropyl)-3,5-dimethoxyaniline
 Electrospray ionization quadrupole time-of-flight mass spectroscopy to measure MOPSO-copper chelated complexes
 Discontinuous gel electrophoresis on rehydratable polyacrylamide gels
 Buffered charcoal yeast extract agar
 Fixing cells in urine in a buffered alcohol
 Testing crude oil bioremediation products in marine environments

See also
 MOPS
 MES
 CAPS
 CHES

References

Zwitterions
4-Morpholinyl compunds
Sulfonic acids